Nagalpur may refer to :-

Nagalpur, Anjar - a village in Kutch.
Nagalpur, Mandvi - a village in Kutch.